Holla is a village in the municipality of Heim in Trøndelag county, Norway.

References

Villages in Trøndelag
Heim, Norway